Golovin Airport  is a state-owned public-use airport located in Golovin, a city in the Nome Census Area of the U.S. state of Alaska.

As per Federal Aviation Administration records, the airport had 1,753 passenger boardings (enplanements) in calendar year 2010, an increase of 8.4% from the 1,617 enplanements in 2009. This airport is included in the FAA's National Plan of Integrated Airport Systems for 2011–2015, which categorized it as a general aviation airport.

Facilities 
Golovin Airport covers an area of 225 acres (91 ha) at an elevation of 59 feet (18 m) above mean sea level. It has one runway designated 2/20 with a gravel surface measuring 4,000 by 75 feet (1,219 x 23 m).

Airlines and destinations 

The following airlines offer scheduled passenger service:

Prior to its bankruptcy and cessation of all operations, Ravn Alaska served the airport from multiple locations.

References

External links 
 FAA Alaska airport diagram (GIF)
 Topographic map from USGS The National Map
 Resources for this airport:
 
 
 
 

Airports in the Nome Census Area, Alaska